A list of notable buildings and structures in Mali:

Bamako
Hippodrome, Bamako
Mali National Museum
Bamako Grand Mosque
Stade Omnisports
National Library of Mali
BCEAO Tower
King Fahd Bridge
Martyrs Bridge
National Museum of Mali
Palais de la Culture Amadou Hampaté Ba